Massango  is a town and municipality in Malanje Province in Angola. The municipality has a population of 32,918 in 2014.

References

Populated places in Uíge Province
Municipalities of Angola